Stranger in Town is a 1957 British crime film directed by George Pollock and starring Alex Nicol and Anne Paige. Arthur Lowe makes a brief appearance in a minor role. It was made by Tempean Films at Alliance Film Studios.

Plot

An American composer, lodging in a quiet English village is found shot dead. A journalist, also from America probes the death on behalf of the pianist’s only relative in America. His trail leads to the local gossip who is later found gassed and debunks the official theory that it was suicide, finding that many people seem to have had reason to commit the crime, as he eventually discovers the truth.

Cast
 Alex Nicol as John Madison
 Anne Paige as Vicky Leigh
 Mary Laura Wood as Lorna Ryland
 Mona Washbourne as Agnes Smith
 Charles Lloyd-Pack as Captain Nash
 Bruce Beeby as William Ryland
 John Horsley as Inspector Powell
 Colin Tapley as Henry Ryland
 Betty Impey as Geraldine Nash
 Peggy Ann Clifford as Mrs Woodham
 Arthur Lowe as the Jeweller
 Willoughby Goddard as the publican

References

External links

1957 films
1950s crime films
British crime drama films
Films directed by George Pollock
Films shot at Southall Studios
Films with screenplays by Edward Dryhurst
Films with screenplays by Norman Hudis
1950s English-language films
1940s English-language films
1940s British films
1950s British films